() was a type of financial official in the Byzantine Empire from the early 11th century onwards, with the task of controlling expenses.

The post is attested until the 14th century. According to peudo-Kodinos, by his time he had no function, but was merely an honorific dignity.

A  ('accountant of the chrysobulls') is also recorded, but its duties are unclear.

References

Sources
 

 
 

Byzantine fiscal offices